Ivar Eriksson (25 December 1909 – 12 April 1997) was a Swedish football defender who played for Sweden in the 1938 FIFA World Cup. He also played for Sandvikens IF.

References

External links
FIFA profile

1909 births
1997 deaths
Swedish footballers
Sweden international footballers
Association football defenders
Sandvikens IF players
1938 FIFA World Cup players